Bakhtiar Dadabhoy is an Indian Parsi author who has written a number of books on the lives of eminent Parsis.

Early life 

He was born in Secunderabad, Telangana. He currently resides in New Delhi. He was educated at Hindu College, University of Delhi & the Delhi School of Economics.

Career 
He himself is a Parsi and he writes primarily on the lives of eminent Parsis, such as J. R. D. Tata and Zubin Mehta.

Bibliography 

His notable books include:
 "Jeh", A Life of J.R.D. Tata
 Sugar in Milk: Lives of Eminent Parsis
 Zubin Mehta: A Musical Journey
 Barons of Banking: Glimpses of Indian Banking History 
 The Magnificent Diwan: The Life and Times of Sir Salar Jung I
 A Book of Cricket Days
 A Dictionary of Dates 
 The Rupa Companion to the ICC Champions Trophy (2006)

See also 
 List of Indian writers

References

External links 

 Official Biography
 Publishers Site

Indian writers
Parsi people
Living people
1963 births